Dietmar Otto Schönherr (17 May 1926 – 18 July 2014) was an Austrian film actor. He appeared in 120 films between 1944 and 2014. He was famous for playing the role of Major Cliff Allister McLane in the German science fiction series Raumpatrouille. He was born in Innsbruck, Austria. He was married to the Danish actress Vivi Bach from 1965 until her death in 2013. In 2011 he was awarded with the Austrian Cross of Honour for Science and Art, 1st class.

Selected filmography

  (Young Eagles) (1944) - Theo Brakke
 Les Amours de Blanche-Neige (1947) - Joe Burton
 Das Fräulein und der Vagabund (1949) - Gerhard Renken
  (1951) - Vigo, Leutnant der Grenzpolizei
 Love's Carnival (1955) - Leutnant Hans Rudloff
 Bonjour Kathrin (1956) - Duval
  (1956) - Müller-Staen jr.
  (1956) - Ferry Singer
 Das Mädchen Marion (1956) - Günter Legler, Turnierreiter
 Made in Germany (1957) - Dr. Roderich Zeiss
 Die verpfuschte Hochzeitsnacht (1957) - Alexander Schulze
 Just Once a Great Lady (1957) - Stefan Riehl
 Spring in Berlin (1957) - Hannes Delk
 Doctor Bertram (1957) - Kurt Losch
 The Elephant in a China Shop (1958) - Clemens
  (1958) - Peter Benrath
  (1958) - Herbert Thanner
 Sehnsucht hat mich verführt (1958) - Albert Hermann
 Frauensee (1958) - Ferry Graf Chur
 Die unvollkommene Ehe (1959) - Rolf Beckmayer
 Every Day Isn't Sunday (1959) - Mitja Burganoff
 Jons und Erdme (1959) - Direktor der Seifenfabrik
  (1959) - Willi Schultz
 Beloved Augustin (1960) - Franz von Gravenreuth
 Darkness Fell on Gotenhafen (1960) - Gaston
  (1960) - Fritz Merlin
 Brainwashed (1960) - Rabbi
 Ingeborg (1960) - Peter
  (1960) - Michael Böhm
 Beloved Impostor (1961) - David Ogden
  (1961) - Dr. Georg Holst
 Melody of Hate (1962) - Dr. Elmer
 The Longest Day (1962) - Häger's Aide (uncredited)
 Commando (1962) - Petit Prince
 The Happy Years of the Thorwalds (1962) - Martin Thorwald
 His Best Friend (1962) - Marius Melichar
 Kohlhiesel's Daughters (1962) - Günter Krüger
  (1963) - Inspektor Eric Harvey
  (1963) - Richard
 Mystery of the Red Jungle (1964) - Ted Barnekow
  (1964) - Klaus Petermann
 The Monster of London City (1964) - Dr. Morely Greely / Michael
 Victim Five (1964) - Dr. Paul Bryson
 The Secret of the Chinese Carnation (1964) - Dr. Cecil Wilkens
  (1965) - Hans Rothe
 Coast of Skeletons (1965) - Piet Van Houten
 Mozambique (1965) - Henderson
 A Holiday with Piroschka (1965) - Alfi Trattenbach
 Come to the Blue Adriatic (1966) - Walter Thomas
 Raumpatrouille (1966, TV series, 7 episodes) - Cliff Allister McLane
  (1966) - Toni
 Kommissar X – Drei grüne Hunde (1967) - Allan Hood / George Hood
  (1968) - Christian Bongert
 April - April (1969) - Ambassador
 Come to Vienna, I'll Show You Something! (1970) - Narrator
  (1978, TV film) - Police Lieutenant Anderson
  (1984) - Talk show host
 The Death of the White Stallion (1985) - Caspar von Schenkenstein
 A Crime of Honour ( A Song for Europe, 1985, TV film) - Junger
 Raffl (1985) - Pfarrer
 Tanner (1985) - Steiner
 Torquemada (1989)
 Reporter (1989, TV series) - Chief Editor Herbst
  (1989) - Brasser
 Journey of Hope (1990) - Massimo
 Mirakel (1990)
  (1992) - Gustav Hohenstein
 By Way of the Stars (1992, TV miniseries) - Friedrich Brunneck
 Night on Fire (1992) - Joshua Jordi
 Family Passions (1993–1994, TV series) - Jürgen Haller
 Rosen aus Jericho (1994)
 Jeden 3. Sonntag (1995)
 Es war doch Liebe? (1995)
 Eine fast perfekte Scheidung (1997) - Dr. Hofbauer
 Back in Trouble (1997) - Dinkelmann
 Am I Beautiful? (1998) - Juan
 Leo & Claire (2001) - Anwalt Dr. Richard Iphraim Herz
  (2001, TV film) - Jon Kamphoven
 Handyman (2006) - Dr. Meyer

References

External links

 Interviews with Dietmar Schönherr in the Online Archive of the Österreichische Mediathek (in German). Retrieved 29 July 2019

1926 births
2014 deaths
Austrian male film actors
Austrian male television actors
20th-century Austrian male actors
21st-century Austrian male actors
German television talk show hosts
Actors from Innsbruck
Recipients of the Austrian Cross of Honour for Science and Art, 1st class